Sark is a village in Chenaran Rural District, in the Central District of Chenaran County, Razavi Khorasan Province, Iran. At the 2006 census, its population was 965, in 219 families.

References 

Populated places in Chenaran County